Ah Nerede is a 1975 film revolving around romantic comedy directed by Orhan Aksoy.

Cast 
 Tarık Akan - Ferit
 Gülşen Bubikoğlu - Zehra
  - Aysel
 Aydan Adan - Selin
 Adile Naşit - Huriye
  - Selin's sister
 Hulusi Kentmen - Ferit's father
 Şükriye Atav - Ferit's mother
 Hayati Hamzaoğlu - Ali Kaya
 Halit Akçatepe - Murat

References

External links 

Turkish romantic comedy films
1970s romantic comedy-drama films
1975 comedy films
1975 drama films
1975 films